Grigol Labadze, better known as Gia Labadze (born 21 September 1973 in  Tbilisi) is a retired Georgian rugby union player. He played as a flanker or number 8.

Domestic career
Labadze moved to France from Russia where he was previously playing domestically in 1998 after being spotted playing for Georgia against Ireland and Romania in the 1999 World Cup qualifiers, he joined Fédérale 2 SO Chambéry initially before joining Toulon in 2000 where he spent the majority of his club career and was a regular part of the side for a decade, helping them to two Pro D2 titles in 2005 and 2008 and captaining them between 2006 and 2007. He left Toulon at the end of the 2008/09 season and alongside Czech winger Martin Jágr, he was given a lap of honour at Toulon's last home game of the season at the Stade Mayol.

After leaving Toulon, Labadze spent the rest of his career in Fédérale 1, he joined Stade Phocéen for a single season and spent his last two seasons with La Seyne before retiring from rugby in 2012.

International career

Labadze played for the Soviet Union at age grade level, and made his debut for Georgia in 1996 against Czech Republic. He was a mainstay of the national side from his debut for 15 years, playing in Georgia's first two World Cup campaigns in 2003 and 2007 and captaining the side on six occasions. He hoped to make Georgia's squad for the 2011 World Cup but failed to do so. However he received a surprise recall aged 38 to the side for the 2012 tour to North America before he retired from rugby.

Labadze retired with 67 caps with 12 tries and as the third most capped Georgian player of all time. And at the age of 38 in his final appearance against Canada in 2012, he is the oldest player ever to play for Georgia and tenth oldest international player of all time.

References

External links
 
 

1973 births
Living people
Rugby union players from Georgia (country)
Rugby union flankers
Expatriate rugby union players from Georgia (country)
Expatriate rugby union players in Russia
Expatriate rugby union players in France
Expatriate sportspeople from Georgia (country) in France
Expatriate sportspeople from Georgia (country) in Russia
Georgia international rugby union players
Rugby union players from Tbilisi